is a 2002 science fiction action anime ona series directed by Makoto Kobayashi, with scripts by Yasushi Hirano and story, layouts, and original concepts by Yasushi Akimoto.

Background
Production began in 2000 with an original release expectation for January 2001.  Character design was by Hiromi Kato and mechanical design was by Makoto Kobayashi.  There are 6 chapters of uneven duration, originally released on the Internet as separate episodes, and the total running time is 100 minutes.

Synopsis
The movie is set in the near-future in a large underground prison at a former nuclear test site in Utah known as Neo Purgatory, where the characters of Maki (Fumiko Orikasa), Naomi (Michiko Neya), Doris (Akemi Okamura), Marilyn (Mayumi Asano), and Katherine (Yuri Shiratori) make up an all-female mercenary outfit called the "Guard of Rose" and acting as a guard patrol.  The prisoners, many of whom are mutated by the ambient radiation, are left to their own devices, but a criminal known as Donn Canyon (Takeshi Watabe) and his family take control of the prison and declare war upon the world by gaining control of the American orbital nuclear missile platform and vowing the "purify the world with radiation" in a nuclear holocaust.  After an abortive attempt by the United States and Soviet militaries to assault the prison, the Guard of Rose is tasked with infiltrating and defeating the Canyon family to preserve global peace.

Cast
 Fumiko Orikasa as Maki Aoba
 Michiko Neya as Naomi Jones
 Akemi Okamura as Doris Nicholas
 Mayumi Asano as Marilyn Moreau 
 Yuri Shiratori as Katherine Hook 
 Takeshi Watabe as Donn G Canyon
 Daisuke Sakaguchi as Akira Canyon
 Hideyuki Umezu as Ed Canyon
 Bunkoh Ogata as Terry Canyon
 Akira Ishida as J C
 Kurumi Mamiya as Link
 Banjou Ginga as Giga
 Junko Noda as Tereshkova
 Katsumi Chou as President of the United States
 Katsuhiro Kitagawa as Premier of the Soviet Union
 Ken Narita as Mike
 Maria Kawamura as Angel
 Takehiro Murozono as First Lieutenant
 Tadahisa Saizen as Tower operator
 Daisuke Kishio as Boy
 Hirotoku Miyata as Leader of U.S. Personnel

Critical reception
T.H.E.M. Anime Reviews felt that director Kobayashi Makoto and scriptwriter Akimoto Yasushi failed in their efforts to create a viewable film.  Among the film's attributes that were panned were the background music sounding "eerily similar to the background of the Care Bears Movie, ethereal and fluffy and jarring and likely the result of a five-year-old banging on a synthesizer," the casting of Mamiya Kurumi as the mecha mascot, Link, who reminding the reviewer of Jar Jar Binks "but with a squeaky Japanese woman's voice," and otherwise talented actresses playing the voices of the Guard of Rose being "uniformly mediocre and less interesting than the girls of the Gall Force", and character designs being bad and characterizations worse.  The reviewer ended his enumeration of multiple flaws by stating (sic) "This really IS the worst anime I've ever seen. 6 Angels has all the elements that could have made a great movie, except for the greatness."

References

External links

2002 anime films
Anime with original screenplays
Action anime and manga
2001 anime ONAs
Films set in Utah
Fiction set in 2026
Japanese science fiction action films
Science fiction anime and manga
Yasushi Akimoto
Japanese animated science fiction films